Yei Joint Stars FC is a professional women football club in Yei,South Sudan. The Yei Joint Stars FC participated in the CAF  Women's Champions League CECAFA competition in 2021 and 2022

List of Award 

 South Sudan Women League Champions

References 

Women's association football clubs